Mandegar Alborz High School is a college-preparatory high school located in the heart of Tehran, Iran. It is one of the first modern high schools in Asia and the Middle East, named after the Alborz mountain range, north of Tehran. Its place in the shaping of Iran's intellectual elite compares with that of Eton College in England and institutions such as Phillips Academy, Phillips Exeter Academy, and Milton Academy in the United States.

History
The school was founded as an elementary school in 1873 by a group of American Presbyterian missionaries led by James Bassett. This was in the 26th year of the reign of Nasereddin Shah Qajar, 22 years after Amir Kabir founded the Dar ul-Funun school in Tehran, and 33 years before the Constitutional Revolution in Persia (as it was known back then; later it became "Iran" during the Reza Shah Era).

When Dr. Samuel Jordan arrived in Persia in 1898, he instituted change; subsequently, Alborz became a 12-year elementary and secondary school, with its share of college courses. Thereafter, the institution came to be known as the American College of Tehran.

Dr. Jordan remained president of Alborz for 42 years (1899–1940). During his tenure, Alborz grew from an elementary school to a high school and college.

In 1932, the school received a permanent charter from the Board of Regents of the State University of New York.

In 1940 and during World War II, by the order of Shah Reza Pahlavi, Alborz was removed from American management and placed under the auspices of the Iranian Ministry of Education as part of Reza Shah's modernization reforms. The school's name was changed from "College" back to "Alborz", and it was reinstated as a high school.

In 1944, Professor Mohammad Ali Mojtahedi, member of University of Tehran's faculty, was appointed as the president of Alborz. From then until 1979, and continuing after the Iranian Revolution, Alborz had the most successful period of its history.

Alborz Principals/Deans
 Mr. Howard (1873–1889)
 Dr. Samuel M. Jordan (1899–1940)
 Mr. Mohammad Vahid Tonekaboni (1940–1941)
 Mr. Mohsen Haddad (1941)
 Mr. Ali Mohammad Partovi (1941–1942)
 Mr. Hasan Zoghi (1942–1943)
 Mr. Lotf Ali Sooratgar (1943–1944)
 Dr. Mohammad Ali Mojtahedi (1944–1978)
 Mr. Hossein Khoshnevisan (1978–1979)
 Mr. Hasan Pour Zahed (1979–1980)
 Mr. Naser Naseri (1980–1981)
 Mr. Ismael Sadegh Kazemi (1981–1985)
 Mr. Rajab Ali Yasipour (1985–1986)
 Mr. Naser Molla Asadollah (1986)
 Mr. Ali Mazarei (1986–1988)
 Mr. Abbas Feiz (1988–1989)
 Mr. Hossein Khoshnevisan (1989–1991)
 Mr. Bagher Dezfulian (1991–1997)
 Mr. Mahmoud Dastani (1998–1999)
 Mr. Valiollah Sanaye (1999–2007)
 Dr. Mazaher Hami Kargar (2007–2011)
 Dr. Abeth Esfandiar (2011–2012)
 Mr. Mohammad Mohammadi (2012–present)

Notable Alborz Deans
 Dr. Mahmoud Behzad

Notable alumni

Politicians
Mostafa Chamran (1932–1981), minister of National Defence and chief of Islamic Revolution Guard Corps (IRGC)
Amir Farshad Ebrahimi (born 1975), political activist
Abdul Rahman Ghassemlou (1930–1989), Kurdish political activist
Mansoor Hekmat (1951–2002), political activist
Dariush Homayoon (1928–2011), minister of Information and Tourism
Ali Javadi (born 1953), political activist
 Ataollah Khosravani, politician
Mostafa Mirsalim (born 1947), politician
Tahmasb Mazaheri (born 1953), politician
Reza Moridi, politician
Alireza Nourizadeh (born 1949), journalist and political activist
Parviz C. Radji (1936–2014), Iranian ambassador to the United Kingdom
Mohsen Sazegara (born 1955), journalist and political activist

Military personnel
Mohammad Amir Khatam (1918–1975), commander in chief of Imperial Iranian Air Force (IIAF) (1958–1975)

Scholars
Solayman Haïm (1887–1970), lexicographer and translator
Manouchehr Sotoudeh (1913–2016), professor of geography
Mahmoud Behzad (1914–2007), professor of biology
Sadeq Chubak (1916–1998), author
Lotfi A. Zadeh (1921–2017), mathematician and professor of computer science
Mohammad Jafar Mahjoub (1924–1996), author and translator
Homayoun Sanaatizadeh (1925–2009), author, translator and entrepreneur
Mohammad-Ali Eslami Nodooshan (born 1925), poet and author
Ali Javan (1926–2016), physicist
Bijan Jalali (1927–2009), poet
Manuchehr Jamali (1928–2012), philosopher and poet
Mohammad Qahraman (1929–2013), poet
Jamshid Giunashvili (1931–2017), linguist, Iranologist, diplomat, author and researcher
Mehdi Zarghamee, professor of computer science
Rahim Rahmanzadeh (born 1934), surgeon
Firouz Partovi (born 1936), physicist
Dariush Ashoori (born 1938), author and translator
Iraj Kaboli (born 1938), author and translator
Paris Moayedi (born 1938), entrepreneur
Hossein Amanat (born 1942), architect
Homayoun Katouzian (born 1942), historian and political scientist
Saeed Sohrabpour (born 1943), professor of mechanical engineering
Foad Rafii (born 1947), architect
Freydoon Shahidi (born 1947), mathematician
Mehrdad Abedi (born 1948), professor of electrical engineering
Caro Lucas (1949–2010), scientist
Abbas Edalat, professor of computer sciences
Ali Parsa (born 1951), translator
Houchang E. Chehabi (born 1954), professor of international relations and history
Cumrun Vafa (born 1960), string theorist
Farzad Nazem (born 1960), former CTO of Yahoo!
Houman Younessi (1963-2016), professor of computer science
Kamyar Kalantar-Zadeh (born 1963), scientist and physician
Kourosh Kalantar-zadeh (born 1971), scientist and inventor
Mehdi Yahyanejad, entrepreneur
Ramin Golestanian, theoretical physicist
David and Paul Merage, entrepreneurs and philanthropists

Artists
Homayoun Khorram (1930–2013), musician
Jamshid Mashayekhi (1934–2019), actor
Khosrow Sinai (born 1941), film director
Siavash Ghomeishi (born 1945), musician, singer and song writer
Amir Parvin Hosseini (born 1967), film producer
Behzad Abdi (born 1973), musician

Athletes
Abbas Ekrami (1915–2001), football manager

Media figures
Adel Ferdosipour (born 1974), football commentator

See also
Dar ol-Fonoon
Education in Iran
Higher education in Iran
Razi High School
Christianity in Iran

References

External links

 

School buildings completed in 1873
Educational institutions established in 1873
High schools in Iran
Architecture in Iran
Schools in Tehran
Iran–United States relations
1873 establishments in Iran
International schools in Tehran